Lohari Jattu is a village in the Bhiwani district of the Indian state of Haryana. , the village had 1,630 households with a population of 8,971, of which 4,631 were male and 4,340 female.

References

Villages in Bhiwani district

In this village most population of hindu and Brahmans